K.S. Saket P.G. College is a government-aided college in Ayodhya, Uttar Pradesh, India. The college is affiliated to Dr. Ram Manohar Lohia Awadh University.

History
K. S. Saket Post Graduation College was established in the year 1951. The institution was established to meet with its goal of empowering the youths with higher education.

Notable alumni 
 Hari Om Pandey

Programmes

Undergraduate
 Bachelor of Arts (B.A)
 Bachelor of Science (B.Sc.)
 Bachelor of Commerce (B.Com.)
 Bachelor of Computer Application (B.C.A.)
 Bachelor of Education (B.Ed.)

Postgraduate
 Master of Arts (M.A)
 Master of Commerce (M.Com)
 Master of Science (M.Sc.)

References

External links
 

Postgraduate colleges in Uttar Pradesh
Colleges of Dr. Ram Manohar Lohia Awadh University
Education in Faizabad
Educational institutions established in 1951
1951 establishments in Uttar Pradesh